Rhinoncomimus latipes, the mile-a-minute weevil, is a species of minute weevil in the family of beetles known as Curculionidae. Originally from Asia, it has been intentionally introduced in North America to control the invasive Asian weed, mile-a-minute (Persicaria perfoliata or Polygonum perfoliatum) which is its food plant.

References

Further reading

External links

 

Bugguide.net. Species Rhinoncomimus latipes - Mile-a-minute Weevil

Curculionidae